Energy system may refer to:
 Energy system, a system primarily designed to supply energy-services to end-users
 Electric power system, for the supply, transfer, and use of electric power
 Thermodynamic system, a physics concept for analysis of thermal energy exchange
 Bioenergetic systems, metabolic processes for converting energy in living organisms

See also 
 Energy modeling
 Energy Systems Language